UFC 227: Dillashaw vs. Garbrandt 2 was a mixed martial arts event that was produced by the Ultimate Fighting Championship and held on August 4, 2018, at the Staples Center in Los Angeles, California.

Background
A UFC Bantamweight Championship rematch between current two-time champion T.J. Dillashaw and former champion Cody Garbrandt headlined the event. They both coached on The Ultimate Fighter: Redemption before the two previously met at UFC 217 in the co-main event. When they fought, Dillashaw won with a second-round knockout to reclaim the title.

A UFC Flyweight Championship rematch between current champion Demetrious Johnson and 2008 Olympic gold medalist in freestyle wrestling Henry Cejudo also co-headlined the event. The pairing previously met at UFC 197, where Johnson defeated Cejudo by first-round TKO to defend his title.

Derek Brunson was expected to face The Ultimate Fighter: Brazil 3 heavyweight winner Antônio Carlos Júnior at the event. However, Brunson pulled out of the fight in early July citing an eye injury. In turn, Carlos Júnior was removed from the card entirely and is expected to be rescheduled for a future event.

Bharat Khandare was scheduled to face Wuliji Buren at the event. However, Khandare was removed from the bout on July 18 for undisclosed reasons and was replaced by Marlon Vera.

A light heavyweight bout between former UFC Light Heavyweight Championship challengers Volkan Oezdemir and Alexander Gustafsson was expected to take place at this event. However, on July 19, it was announced that Oezdemir pulled out due to a broken nose. In turn, Gustafsson pulled out on July 22 due to a minor injury. A middleweight bout between Thiago Santos and UFC newcomer Kevin Holland was created to fill the vacant spot on the main card.

Benito Lopez was expected to face Ricky Simón at the event. However, Lopez pulled out of the bout on July 24 due to an undisclosed injury and was replaced by promotional newcomer Montel Jackson.

On August 1, a bantamweight bout between former UFC Women's Bantamweight Championship challenger Bethe Correia and Irene Aldana was pulled from this event due to an injury suffered by Correia.

Results

Bonus awards
The following fights received $50,000 bonuses:
Fight of the Night: Henry Cejudo vs. Demetrious Johnson
Performance of the Night: T.J. Dillashaw and Renato Moicano

Reported payout
The following is the reported payout to the fighters as reported to the California State Athletic Commission. It does not include sponsor money and also does not include the UFC's traditional "fight night" bonuses. The total disclosed payout for the event was $866,000.
 T.J. Dillashaw: $350,000 (no win bonus) def. Cody Garbrandt: $200,000
 Henry Cejudo: $100,000 (no win bonus) def. Demetrious Johnson: $380,000
 Renato Moicano: $52,000 (includes $26,000 win bonus) def. Cub Swanson: $90,000
 J.J. Aldrich: $36,000 (includes $18,000 win bonus) def. Polyana Viana: $12,000
 Thiago Santos: $96,000 (includes $48,000 win bonus) def. Kevin Holland: $13,000
 Pedro Munhoz: $84,000 (includes $42,000 win bonus) def. Brett Johns: $22,000 
 Ricky Simón: $24,000 (includes $12,000 win bonus) def. Montel Jackson: $10,000
 Ricardo Ramos: $28,000 (includes $14,000 win bonus) def. Kyung Ho Kang: $16,000 
 Sheymon Moraes: $20,000 (includes $10,000 win bonus) def. Matt Sayles: $10,000
 Alex Perez: $28,000 (includes $14,000 win bonus) def. Jose Torres: $14,000
 Zhang Weili: $28,000 (includes $14,000 win bonus) def. Danielle Taylor: $20,000
 Marlon Vera: $64,000 (includes $32,000 win bonus) def. Wuliji Buren: $10,000

See also
List of UFC events
2018 in UFC
List of current UFC fighters

References

Notes

Ultimate Fighting Championship events
2018 in mixed martial arts
August 2018 sports events in the United States
Mixed martial arts in California
Mixed martial arts in Los Angeles
Sports competitions in Los Angeles
2018 in sports in California
Events in Los Angeles